Stenanthera conostephioides, commonly known as flame heath, is a species of small shrub that is endemic to south-eastern continental Australia. It has linear to lance-shaped leaves, red, tubular flowers and green, oval fruit turning dark red.

Description
The petal lobes are densely hairy on the inside near their tips. Flowering occurs from March to November.

Taxonomy and naming
Stenanthera conostephioides was first formally described in 1845 by Otto Wilhelm Sonder in Lehmann's Plantae Preissianae from specimens collected by Theodor Siemssen near Port Adelaide in 1839. The specific epithet (conostephioides) refers to the similarity of this species to a plant in the genus Conostephium.

Distribution and habitat
Flame heath grows in mallee scrub and open forest in sandy soil. It is a common species, occurring in western Victoria and the south east of South Australia.

Ecology
The flowers of this species form an important part of the diet of emus.

References

conostephioides
Ericales of Australia
Flora of South Australia
Flora of Victoria (Australia)
Plants described in 1845
Taxa named by Otto Wilhelm Sonder